Republic 100.3 was a local music radio station, based in Pylaia, Thessaloniki, Greece. The station was originally launched in 1996 as Planet. Ιn 2005, it was renamed as Republic and in 2019 split into two radio stations. Republic switched to internet radio while 100.3 FM replaced by Transistor (or Tranzistor).

History
Republic was founded in 2005 by a group of people that loved freedom and democracy in music, independent speaking on-air and finally, that wanted to bring a genre of music that Thessaloniki city was missing. It is also a pure music station focusing on the sophisticated and eclectic style of sounds. The radio was also a big fan base out of Thessaloniki city with listeners through the internet. In 2016 it has become a zero talk radio and changed its format.

Republic Radio and Transistor 100.3 are part of a media group named Metromedia.

External links
Republic Radio
Tranzistor FM 100,3
Republic Radio - Official Facebook Page
Tranzistor FM 100,3 - Official Facebook Page

Defunct radio stations in Greece
Mass media in Thessaloniki
Internet radio stations